"Heartbeat" is a song by the British record producer Wilkinson, featuring vocals from English grime MC P Money and English singer Arlissa. It was released on 26 July 2013, through RAM Records, as the third single from his debut album Lazers Not Included. The song has peaked at number 169 on the UK Singles Chart and number 36 on the UK Dance Chart.

Music video
A music video to accompany the release of "Heartbeat" was first released onto YouTube on 24 June 2013 at a total length of three minutes and twenty-five seconds.

Track listing

Chart performance

Weekly charts

Release history

References

Wilkinson (musician) songs
Arlissa songs
2013 songs
2013 singles
RAM Records singles
Songs written by Arlissa
Songs written by Mark Taylor (record producer)
Songs written by P-Money